The New Zealand Open Source Awards celebrate open source developments in New Zealand at a biannual awards ceremony, held since 2007. The awards are run by the New Zealand Open Source Society.

Past winners of New Zealand Open Source Awards

References

New Zealand awards
Free software